This is a list of hot dog dishes. A hot dog is a type of cooked sausage, traditionally grilled or steamed and served in a partially sliced bun. This type of sausage was culturally imported from Germany and popularized in the United States, where it became a working-class street food sold at hot dog stands and carts. It is also sold at fast food restaurants and convenience stores, as well as being available for home preparation after being purchased at grocery stores. The hot dog became closely associated with baseball and American culture. Hot dog preparation and condiments vary regionally in the US.

Hot dogs

 Bratwurst – often served in a bread roll alongside sauerkraut and mustard, can be considered a type of hot dog.
 Bagel dog – of a full-size or miniature hot dog, wrapped in bagel-style breading before or after cooking
 Cheese dog – served with cheese or processed cheese on it or stuffed within it as a filling
 Chicago-style hot dog – an all-beef frankfurter on a poppy seed bun that originated in the city of Chicago, Illinois. The hot dog is topped with yellow mustard, chopped white onions, bright green sweet pickle relish, a dill pickle spear, tomato slices or wedges, pickled sport peppers, and a dash of celery salt (but no ketchup).
 Chili dog – the generic name for a hot dog served in a bun and topped with some sort of meat sauce, such as chili con carne. Often other toppings are also added, such as cheese, onions, and mustard.
 Cincinnati cheese coney – a hot dog topped with Cincinnati chili and thinly shredded sharp cheddar cheese, on a steamed bun
 Completo – a Chilean hot dog usually served with ingredients such as chopped tomatoes, avocados, mayonnaise, sauerkraut, Chilean chili, green sauce and cheese.
 Coney Island hot dog – a hot dog sandwich in a bun topped with a savory meat sauce and sometimes other toppings
 Corn dog – sausage (usually a hot dog) coated in a thick layer of cornmeal batter on a stick
 Danger dog – a hot dog that has been wrapped in bacon and deep-fried
 Dodger Dog – a hot dog named after the Major League Baseball Los Angeles Dodgers franchise that sells them
 Half-smoke – a hot dog dish found in Washington, D.C., and the surrounding region
 Hamdog – an Australian sandwich that consists of a shaped bread bun with a beef patty cut in two, and a frankfurter placed in between the two halves which is then topped off with cheese, pickles, sauces, tomato, lettuce and onion
 Hot wiener – a staple of the food culture of Rhode Island where it is primarily sold at "New York System" restaurants.
 Hungarian Hot Dog – the "hot dog" is really a Hungarian sausage called kolbász, a specialty in Northwestern Ohio and the signature sandwich of Tony Packo's Cafe. The sausage is split and is often found topped with mustard, chili, cheese and onions.
 Italian hot dog – a type of hot dog popular in New Jersey, United States A common preparation is frying hot dogs in oil, covering them with potatoes, peppers and onions, and then placing all of this inside of pizza bread.
 Ketwurst – a type of hot dog created in the German Democratic Republic, it involves the heating of a special Bockwurst, larger than regular hot dogs, in water. A long roll is pierced by a hot metal cylinder, which creates an appropriate sized hole. The sausage is then dunked in ketchup and put inside of the roll.
 Klobasnek – a savory finger food of Czech origin
 Maxwell Street Polish – a grilled or fried length of Polish sausage topped with grilled onions and yellow mustard and optional pickled whole, green sport peppers, served on a bun. The sandwich traces its origins to Chicago's Maxwell Street market.
 Michigan hot dog – a steamed hot dog on a steamed bun topped with a meaty sauce, generally referred to as "Michigan sauce". 
 Montreal hot dog – one of several variations of hot dogs served as a fast food staple at restaurants and diners in Montreal and other parts of Quebec
 New England-style hot dog – a steamed frankfurter on a top-cut bun that originated in the city of Boston, Massachusetts. Ketchup, mustard, relish, picalilli, and chopped onions are the most common toppings.
 Polish Boy – a sausage sandwich native to Cleveland, Ohio. It consists of a link of kielbasa placed in a bun, and covered with a layer of french fries, a layer of barbecue sauce or hot sauce, and a layer of coleslaw.
 Pronto Pup – a style of corn dog popular in the midwest. A sausage (usually a hot dog) coated in a thick layer of pancake batter on a stick and cooked.
 Ripper – the slang term for a type of hot dog. The name derives from a hot dog which is deep fried in oil and having some casings burst, or "rip".
 Seattle-style hot dog – a hot dog topped with cream cheese that is often sold from late night or game day food carts in Seattle, Washington
 Sonoran hot dog – a style of hot dog popular in Tucson, Phoenix, and elsewhere in southern Arizona. It originated in Hermosillo, the capital of the Mexican state of Sonora, in the late 1980s, and consists of a hot dog that is wrapped in bacon and grilled, served on a bolillo-style hot dog bun, and topped with pinto beans, onions, tomatoes, and a variety of additional condiments, often including mayonnaise, mustard, and jalapeño salsa.
 Texas Tommy – an American hot dog dish in which a hot dog is prepared with bacon and cheese. It was invented in Pottstown, Pennsylvania in the 1950s.
 Vegetarian hot dog – a hot dog produced entirely from non-meat products
 White hot – a variation on the hot dog found primarily in the Central New York and Western New York areas. It is composed of a combination of uncured and unsmoked pork, beef, and veal; the lack of smoking or curing allows the meat to retain a naturally white color.

See also

 Hot dog variations
 List of hot dog restaurants
 List of sandwiches
 List of sausage dishes
 World's longest hot dog

References

External links
 

Hot dogs
Lists of foods by type